"Best of Me" (also known as "The Best of Me") is the second single from the Chrisette Michele album, I Am. It has not received much attention on the charts, although it was added to the VH1 video lineup.  An unplugged version of the song was featured on the VH1 website.

Credits and personnel

Credits adapted from Discogs and Allmusic.

Chrisette Michele: vocals, writer, composer
Babyface: writer, composer, producer, keyboards and drum programming, acoustic guitar
Rob Lewis: strings arranger, keyboards
The Movement Orchestra: strings
Christopher Johnson and Robert Smith: drums
Paul Boutin: recording engineer
Jon Gass: mixing engineer

References

2007 singles
Chrisette Michele songs
Songs written by Babyface (musician)
2007 songs
Songs written by Chrisette Michele
American jazz songs